This is a summary of 1900 in music in the United Kingdom.

Events
April – Charles Villiers Stanford resigns from the Irish Literary Society in protest at anti-monarchist sentiments expressed by W. B. Yeats.
3 October – Edward Elgar's The Dream of Gerontius receives its première in Birmingham.
25 June – Charles Villiers Stanford's cantata, The Last Post, is privately premièred at Buckingham Palace.
22 November – An honorary doctorate in music is conferred on Edward Elgar by the University of Cambridge, England
unknown date – Arnold Bax enters the Royal Academy of Music.

Popular music
"I Love You, Ma Cherie", words and music by Paul Rubens, music by Edward Elgar.
"Violets", words by Julian Fane, music by Ellen Wright.

Classical music: new works
Frederic Austin – Overture to Richard II, for orchestra
Rutland Boughton – The Chilterns, symphonic suite
Edward Elgar – The Dream of Gerontius
Joseph Holbrooke – The Raven
Gustav Holst – Symphony in F major "The Cotswolds" 
Hamish MacCunn – The Masque of War and Peace
Sir John Blackwood McEwen – Graih My Chree, Recitation Music for 2 violins, viola, cello, piano and percussion
Percy Pitt – Ballade for violin and orchestra
William Wallace – Jacobite Songs, for voice and orchestra

Opera
Kain, with music by Eugen d'Albert and libretto by Heinrich Bulthaupt (premièred in Berlin, Germany)

Musical theatre
3 February – The Messenger Boy, by James T. Tanner and Alfred Murray, with lyrics by Adrian Ross and Percy Greenbank, and music by Ivan Caryll and Lionel Monckton (additional numbers by Paul Rubens), opens at the Gaiety Theatre, and runs for 428 performances. 
26 April – Pretty Polly, by Basil Hood, with music by François Cellier, opens at the Theatre Royal, Colchester,  as a companion piece to Hood and Sir Arthur Sullivan's The Rose of Persia. It later moves to the Savoy Theatre, for a run of 26 performances from 19 May 1900 to 28 June 1900, and from 8 December 1900 to 20 April 1901 along with the first revival of Gilbert and Sullivan's 1881 hit, Patience, a run of 102 performances.

Births
23 January – William Ifor Jones, composer (d. 1988)
3 February – Mabel Mercer, English-born singer and actress (d. 1984)
6 February – Guy Warrack, composer, music educator and conductor (d. 1986)
2 June – David Wynne, Welsh composer (d. 1983)
10 July – Evelyn Laye, actress and singer (d. 1996)
12 September – Eric Thiman, composer (d. 1975)
17 December – George Lambert, operatic baritone and teacher (d. 1971)
22 December – Alan Bush, pianist, composer and conductor (d. 1995)

Deaths
22 January – David Edward Hughes, musician and inventor, 68
13 March – Alicia Ann Spottiswoode, songwriter, 89
28 May – George Grove, compiler of the well-known dictionary of music, 79
22 November – Sir Arthur Sullivan, composer, 58 (kidney disease)
8 December – Henry Russell, pianist, baritone singer and composer

See also
 1900 in the United Kingdom

References

British Music, 1900 in
Music
British music by year
1900s in British music